The third season of Will & Grace premiered on October 12, 2000 and concluded on May 17, 2001. It consisted of 25 episodes.

Cast and characters

Main cast 
 Eric McCormack as Will Truman
 Debra Messing as Grace Adler
 Megan Mullally as Karen Walker
 Sean Hayes as Jack McFarland
 Shelley Morrison as Rosario Salazar

Recurring cast 
 Gregory Hines as Ben Doucette
 Tim Bagley as Larry
 Jerry Levine as Joe
 Tom Gallop as Rob
 Leigh-Allyn Baker as Ellen
 Marshall Manesh as Mr. Zamir
 Leslie Jordan as Beverley Leslie
 Woody Harrelson as Nathan
 Michael Angarano as Elliot

Special guest stars 
 Patrick Dempsey as Matthew
 Jeremy Piven as Nicholas
 Camryn Manheim as Psychic Sue
 Cher as herself
 Debbie Reynolds as Bobbie Adler
 Martina Navratilova as herself
 Sandra Bernhard as herself
 Ellen DeGeneres as Sister Louise
 Sydney Pollack as George Truman
 Lesley Ann Warren as Tina
 Christine Ebersole as Candace Pruytt
 Ellen Albertini Dow as Sylvia Walker
 Molly Shannon as Val Bassett

Guest stars 
 Corey Parker as Josh
 Natasha Lyonne as Gillian
 Maria Pitillo as Paula
 Ever Carradine as Pam
 Sara Rue as Joyce Adler
 Ken Marino as Mark
 Joel McHale as Ian
 Peter Jacobson as Paul Budnik
 Gigi Rice as Heidi Dauro
 Alex Kapp Horner as Alice Robinson
 Todd Stashwick as Gabe Robinson

Following the death of Leslie Jordan in 2022, writer Jeff Greenstein revealed that Joan Collins was in negotiations to reprise her role of Helena Barnes from the previous season episode "My Best Friend's Tush". However, after reading the final script, Collins backed out. The role was rewritten to create the role of Beverly Leslie, who debuted in "My Uncle the Car".

Episodes

References

3
2000 American television seasons
2001 American television seasons
Television episodes directed by James Burrows